Allo may refer to:

allo-, a prefix used in linguistics to form terms for variant forms
Allo (company), a Ukrainian electronics distribution company
"Allo" (song), a 2021 song by Loboda
Allo, Navarre, a town in Spain
'Allo, a form of Hello
Allo Communications, a fiber-optic telecommunications company and subsidiary of Nelnet
Google Allo, the discontinued AI-based messaging app made by Google
Allopregnanolone, a neurosteroid sometimes abbreviated as "ALLO"

See also
'Allo 'Allo!, a British television sitcom
"Allô, allô", a song by Ilona

Alo (disambiguation), for a list of meanings of "Alo" and "ALO"